Bert Johnston, Vice Commander of the Naval Air Systems Command

Bert Johnston may also refer to:

Bertie Johnston (1880–1942), Australian politician
Bert Johnston (footballer) (1909–1968), Scottish footballer
Herbert Johnston (1902–1967), British runner

See also
Albert Johnston (disambiguation)
Hubert Johnston (disambiguation)
Robert Johnston (disambiguation)
Bert Johnson (disambiguation)